Tibor Draskovics (born 26 June 1955) is a Hungarian politician, who served as Minister of Finance between 2004 and 2005 and as Minister of Justice and Law Enforcement between 2008 and 2009. He was member of the Hungarian Olympic Committee from 1994 to 1998.

References
 MEH életrajz Biography

1955 births
Living people
Politicians from Budapest
Finance ministers of Hungary
Justice ministers of Hungary
Members of the Bajnai Government